Pinangat na isda, also called pangat na isda, is a Filipino dish from Southern Luzon consisting of fish and tomatoes stewed in a broth soured with fruits like calamansi, bilimbi, tamarind, or santol. It can also be used to cook shrimp. It is similar to sinigang, but it is not as tart.

Pinangat na isda may also sometimes be referred to as paksiw, a related but different dish which primarily uses vinegar to sour the broth. Pinangat na isda is also commonly confused with laing (also called pinangat na laing or pinangat na gabi), a Bicolano dish also known simply as pinangat. But they are different dishes.

See also
Ginataang isda
 Linarang
Sinampalukan
Tinola
Cuisine of the Philippines

References

Philippine stews
Fish dishes
Philippine seafood dishes